Mareleptopoma is a genus of small sea snails, marine gastropod molluscs in the subfamily Pickworthiinae  of the family Pickworthiidae .

Species
 Mareleptopoma defluxa Rolán, 2005
 Mareleptopoma drivasi Le Renard & Bouchet, 2003
 Mareleptopoma intermedia Le Renard & Bouchet, 2003
 Mareleptopoma iredalei (Bavay, 1922)
 Mareleptopoma karpatensis Moolenbeek & Faber, 1984
 † Mareleptopoma kenneyi (Ladd, 1966) 
 Mareleptopoma minor (Almera & Bofill, 1898)
 Mareleptopoma pellucens Le Renard & Bouchet, 2003
 Mareleptopoma rectangularis Rolán & Fernández-Garcés, 1993
 Mareleptopoma spinosa (Hedley, 1902)
 Mareleptopoma vaubani Le Renard & Bouchet, 2003
Species brought into synonymy
 Mareleptopoma chefyae Rolán, Espinosa & Fernández-Garcés, 1991: synonym of Clatrosansonia chefyae (Rolán, Espinosa & Fernández-Garcés, 1991) (original combination)
 Mareleptopoma circumserrata Raines, 2002: synonym of Clatrosansonia circumserrata (Raines, 2002) (original combination)
 Mareleptopoma cubensis Espinosa, Fernández-Garcés & Rolán, 1990: synonym of Clatrosansonia cubensis (Espinosa, Fernández-Garcés & Rolán, 1990) (original combination)
 Mareleptopoma italica (Raffi & Taviani, 1985): synonym of Mareleptopoma minor (Almera & Bofill, 1898)
 Mareleptopoma katyae Rolán, Espinosa & Fernández-Garcés, 1991: synonym of Chrystella katyae (Rolán, Espinosa & Fernández-Garcés, 1991) (original combination)
 Mareleptopoma scalaris Rolán & Fernández-Garcés, 1993: synonym of Clatrosansonia scalaris (Rolán & Fernández-Garcés, 1993) (original combination)
 Mareleptopoma verdensis Rolán & Rubio, 1999: synonym of Chrystella verdensis (Rolán & Rubio, 1999) (original combination)

References

 Le Renard, J. & Bouchet, P., 2003. New species and genera of the family Pickworthiidae (Mollusca, Caenogastropoda). Zoosystema 25(4): 569-591